Torrella immersa is a species of an operculate land snail, terrestrial gastropod mollusk in the family Pomatiidae.

Distribution 
This species lives in Cuba, for example at Pan de Matanzas.

Ecology 

This snail is usually a rock-dwelling species.

Predators of Torrella immersa include larvae of the firefly bug Alecton discoidalis.

References

Pomatiidae
Gastropods described in 1857
Endemic fauna of Cuba